Stress-related disorders constitute a category of mental disorders. They are maladaptive, biological and psychological responses to short- or long-term exposures to physical or emotional stressors. The National Institute of Environmental Health Sciences categories Obsessive-Compulsive Disorder (OCD) and Post-Traumatic Stress Disorder (PTSD) as stress-related disorders. However, the World Health Organization's ICD-11 excludes OCD but categories PTSD, Complex Post-Traumatic Stress Disorder (CPTSD), adjustment disorder as stress-related disorders.

Stress is a conscious or unconscious psychological feeling or physical condition resulting from physical or mental 'positive or negative pressure' that overwhelms adaptive capacities. It is a psychological process initiated by events that threaten, harm or challenge an organism or that exceed available coping resources and it is characterized by psychological responses that are directed towards adaptation. Stress is wear and tear on the body in response to stressful agents. Hans Selye called such agents: stressors, which are physical, physiological or sociocultural. Stress-related disorders differ from anxiety disorders, and do not constitute a normative concept.

A person typically is stressed when positive or negative (e.g., threatening) experiences temporarily strain or overwhelm adaptive capacities. Stress is highly individualized and depends on variables such as the novelty, rate, intensity, duration, or personal interpretation of the input, and genetic or experiential factors. Both acute and chronic stress can intensify morbidity from anxiety disorders. One person's fun may be another person's stressor. For an example, panic attacks are more frequent when the predisposed person is exposed to stressors.

Stress reduction strategies 

Stress-reduction strategies can be helpful to many stressed/anxious people. However, many anxious persons cannot concentrate enough to use such strategies effectively for acute relief. (Most stress-reduction techniques have their greatest utility as elements of a prevention plan that attempts to raise one's threshold to anxiety-provoking experiences.)

The five R's of stress and anxiety reduction

Five core concepts are used to reduce anxiety or stress.

Recognition of the causes and sources of the threat or distress; education and consciousness raising.
Relationships identified for support, help, reassurance 
Removal (from or of) the threat or stressor; managing the stimulus.
Relaxation through techniques such as meditation, massage, breathing exercises, or imagery.
Re-engagement through managed re-exposure and desensitization.

Defenses 

Defense mechanisms are behavior patterns primarily concerned with protecting ego. Presumably the process is unconscious and the aim is to fool oneself. It is intra psychic processes serving to provide relief from emotional conflict and anxiety. Conscious efforts are frequently  made for the same reasons, but true defense mechanisms are unconscious.

Some of the common defense mechanisms are:
compensation, conversion, denial, displacement, dissociation, idealization, identification, incorporation, introjection, projection, rationalization, reaction formation, regression, sublimation, substitution, symbolization and undoing.

Summary 

The major function of these psychological defenses is to prevent the experiencing of painful emotions. There are several major problems with their use.
 
Many of these defenses create new problems that are as bad, or worse, than the emotional problems they mask. Some may be just plain destructive. Example: rejection literally destroys the relationships we care most about.
These defenses distort person's ability to perceive reality as it is. And this prevents them from dealing with their problems in a constructive way.
These defenses do not get rid of the painful feelings. In fact, by masking them so that person doesn't feel them, they effectively store them up within themselves.  Emotions are discharged through expression, so by denying themselves the chance to feel them, they also deny themselves the ability to get rid of them.
These defenses do not just screen out painful emotions. They are, in fact, defenses against all emotion. So the more effective person's defenses become in protecting them from painful feelings, the less able they are to experience the joyful and happy feelings that make life worth living.
These defenses are not perfect. As more and more hurt is stored away, a tension is developed. Person becomes increasingly anxious, nervous, and irritable. They become emotionally unpredictable. And when defenses weaken, from time to time, person may experience emotional explosions.
These defenses prevent person from knowing what is wrong, but they do not prevent us from feeling bad.

Stress as in clinical medicine

Acute stress disorder 
Acute stress disorder occurs in individuals without any other apparent psychiatric disorder, in response to exceptional physical or psychological stress. While severe, such reactions usually subside within hours or days. The stress may be an overwhelming traumatic experience (e.g. accident, battle, physical assault, rape) or unusually sudden change in social circumstances of the individual, such as multiple bereavement.
Individual vulnerability and coping capacity play a role in the occurrence and severity of acute stress reactions, as evidenced by the fact that not all people exposed to exceptional stress develop symptoms. However, an acute stress disorder falls under the class of an anxiety disorder.

Symptoms
Symptoms show considerable variation but usually include:
An initial state of "DAZE" with some constriction of the field of consciousness and narrowing of attention, inability to comprehend stimuli, disorientation. Followed either by further withdrawal from the surrounding situation to the extent of a dissociative stupor or by agitating and over activity.

Autonomic signs of "panic anxiety"  
The signs are: tachycardia (increased heart rate), sweating, hyperventilation (increased breathing).
The symptoms usually appear within minutes of the impact of the stressful stimulus and disappear within 2–3 days.

Post-traumatic stress disorder (PTSD)

This arises after response to a stressful event or situation of an exceptionally threatening nature and likely to cause pervasive distress (great pain, anxiety, sorrow, acute physical or mental suffering, affliction, trouble) in almost anyone.

Causes 
The causes of PTSD are: natural or human disasters, war, serious accident, witness of violent death of others, violent attack, being the survivor of sexual abuse, rape, torture, terrorism or hostage taking.

The predisposing factors are: personality traits and previous history of psychiatric illness.

Typical symptoms 

Flashbacks are the repeated reliving of the trauma in the form of intrusive memories or dreams, intense distress at exposure to events that symbolize or resemble an aspect of the traumatic event, including  anniversaries of the trauma, avoidance of activities and situations reminiscent of the trauma, emotional blunting or "numbness", a sense of detachment from other people, autonomic hyperarousal with hypervigilance, an enhanced startle reaction and insomnia, marked anxiety and depression and, occasionally, suicidal ideation.

Treatment
Psychiatric consultation: exploration of memories of the traumatic event, relief of associated symptoms and counseling.

Prognosis 
The course is fluctuating but recovery can be expected in the majority of cases. Few people may show chronic course over many years and a transition to an enduring personality change

In surgery

Stress ulceration 
Stress ulceration is a single or multiple fundic mucosal ulcers that causes upper gastrointestinal bleeding, and develops during the severe physiologic stress of serious illness. It can also cause mucosal erosions and superficial hemorrhages in patients who are critically ill, or in those who are under extreme physiologic stress, causing blood loss that can require blood transfusion.

Ordinary peptic ulcers are found commonly in the "gastric antrum and the duodenum" whereas stress ulcers are found commonly in "fundic mucosa and can be located anywhere within the stomach and proximal duodenum".

See also 
 Critical incident stress management
 Stress management
 Stress (biology)
 Gastritis

References

Further reading
Selye H. Syndrome produced by diverse nocuous agents. Nature. 1936;138:32.
Hales RE, Zatazick DF (1997) What is PTSD? American Journal of Psychiatry 154: 143-145
Royal College of Physicians/Royal College of Psychiatrist (1995) The Psychological Care of Medical Patients: Recognition of Need and Service Provision. London: RCPhys/RCPsych

Psychological stress
Stress-related disorders